The Șugura is a left tributary of the river Trotuș in Romania. It flows into the Trotuș near Agăș.

References

Rivers of Romania
Rivers of Bacău County